Alcyone is a ship launched at La Rochelle in 1985 for the Cousteau Society. Alcyone was created as an expedition ship and to test the operation of a new kind of marine propulsion system, the turbosail. Alcyones two turbosails augment its diesel engines.

Alcyone in popular culture
 John Denver wrote a short song called "Alcyone The Wind" as a tribute to Alcyone. The song was sung in the 1993 documentary Secret Societies of Dolphins and Whales.

References

External links

 Cousteau Society's ship page for the Alcyone
 Jean-Charles Nahon (Naval Architect Bureau Mauric) and Bernard Deguy (First captain of Alcyone): Experience with sail assisted propulsion: the Alcyone (presentation slides, 2013. PDF, 13 MB)
 Description of Turbosail

1985 ships
Research vessels of France
Marine propulsion
Wind-powered vehicles
Jacques Cousteau